Marc Demuth (born 1978) is a Luxembourg jazz musician who has founded different jazz bands. He is also a composer and he plays double bass and electric bass.

Education 
Born in Luxembourg City in 1978, holds diplomas in electric bass and Jazz double bass of the “Conservatoire Royal de Bruxelles”, as well as a bachelor and a master's degree of the Royal Conservatory of The Hague, the Netherlands.

Biography 
In 1996, at the young age of 18, he won a scholarship for studying electric bass at the famous Berklee College of Music, while participating at their annual workshop in Perugia, Italy.
In December 2000 he accompanied the World Youth Choir on their tour through Benelux, Germany and France, which ended with the recording of a CD.
In 2004 he was selected to be part of the European Jazz Orchestra on their tour through Europe and Brazil, under the conduction of the Portuguese leader and composer Pedro Moreira.
From 2003 to 2010 he was working with the Portuguese singer Sofia Ribeiro in different projects, having released his first CD, “Dança da Solidão” in 2006, in duo with the singer. At the same time Marc was leading his own quartet with the vibraphone player Pascal Schumacher, the clarinet player Joachim Badenhorst and the drummer Yves Peeters. In 2008 he releases the CD “ORIK” with the Marc Demuth 4tet featuring Sofia Ribeiro.
He shared the stage with musicians like Michael Brecker, Kenny Werner, Slide Hampton, Erwin Van, Hein van de Geyn, Florian Weber, Jef Neve, John Ruocco, Guy Cabay, Jacques Pirroton, Phil Abraham and Felix Simtaine, amongst others.
He has been playing in many different festivals like: Montreux Jazz Festival (Switzerland), Brussels Jazz Marathon (Belgium), North Sea Jazz Festival (Netherlands), European Jazz Festival (Greece), Festival JAZZ AND SOUND (Belgium), Francophonie New York (E.U.A.), FIMU (France), Jazzfest Eurocore Trier (Germany), Jazz ‘In Tondela (Portugal), Douro Jazz (Portugal), Jazz-Rallye Luxembourg City (Luxembourg), Jazz UTSAV Festival (New Delhi), Dose Dupla (CCB, Lisbon), Gaume Jazz Festival (Belgium), Jazz au Chellah (Morocco), Jazz à Ouaga (Burkina Faso), Silesian Jazz Festival (Poland), Völklinger Hüttenjazz Festival (Germany), Nargen Jazz Festival (Estonia).
Recently he is part of the RDW Trio with the piano player Michel Reis and the drummer Paul Wiltgen.
He is currently based in Luxembourg, and he is leading the jazz-department of the Music School of Echternach where he also teaches electric bass, double bass and jazz ensemble.

Awards 
Best Soloist - Rotary Jazz Competition, Belgium (2001)
Together with the Pascal Schumacher Quartet, First Prize and Public Prize, Tremplin Jazz Avignon (2004)
Together with the portuguese singer Sofia Ribeiro in duo, First Prize at the Crest Vocal Jazz Competition (2010)

Discography 
"Dança da Solidão"  Marc Demuth/ Sofia Ribeiro Duo (2006)
"Travelling Light" Sascha Ley Band (2007)
"ORIK" Marc Demuth Quartet feat. Sofia Ribeiro (2008)

Homepage 
www.marcdemuth.com

References 

1978 births
Living people
People from Luxembourg City
Luxembourgian jazz musicians